Tetramorium hispidum is a species of ant in the subfamily Myrmicinae. Tetramorium hispidum differs from similar ants in the Myrmicinae subfamily by the structure surrounding the ant's antennal insertions. Short, stubble-like hairs exist on the pronotum and frontal carinae. The antenna of Tetramorium hispidum contains 11 segments.

References

 Hansson C, Lachaud J, Pérez-Lachaud G (2011). "Entedoninae wasps (Hymenoptera, Chalcidoidea, Eulophidae) associated with ants (Hymenoptera, Formicidae) in tropical America, with new species and notes on their biology". ZooKeys 134: 62–82.

hispidum
Insects described in 1915